New York Noise is a one-hour indie-rock music video television program which aired from 2003–2009 on NYC Media in New York and parts of New Jersey and Connecticut. It was created, produced, and edited by Shirley Braha and funded by New York City under the Bloomberg administration. The show was "devoted to music videos, live footage, and high jinx from bands that ride the L train." According to The New York Times, it is "a groundbreaking show that has attracted a loyal following among musicians   It is no longer in production since the station's rebranding in 2010, despite a petition and campaign which attempted to save it.

Notable bands and personalities that have hosted episodes include Animal Collective, Vampire Weekend, Fischerspooner, Beirut, The National, Au Revoir Simone, Aziz Ansari, Eugene Mirman, Brett Davis and more.

Development
Shirley Braha, a New York native, first developed "New York Noise" in 2003 while working on her bachelor's degree at Smith College. NYC Media General Manager Arick Wierson offered Braha a show in part because of her local cred and experience." The show began airing in fall of 2003, and by the end of 2004, after NYC Media acquired channel 25 and Braha had graduated, the episodes began featuring original segments.

Episode List and Featured Guests or Subjects

2009

Episode 89: Vivian Girls perform live, Love Is All give love advice, an interview with Chairlift and a SXSW 2009 roundup with clips of The Beets, Box Elders, Thao & The Get Down Stay Down, Micachu & The Shapes, Kurt Vile, Woods, and Blank Dogs. Music videos from: Ducktails, Crystal Antlers, Camera obscura, The Pains of Being Pure at Heart, Chairlift, Fever Ray, Parenthetical Girls, Shy Child, Marnie Stern, The Sea and Cake and Galaxie 500.
Episode 88: Live footage of The Pains of Being Pure at Heart & Deerhoof, MC Steinberg (aka Brett Davis) talks to The King Khan & BBQ Show, The Real Housewives of New York Noise, Lykke Li. Music videos from: Those Dancing Days, School of Seven Bells, Benoit Pouilard, Girls, Casiokids, El Guincho, Sebastian Tellier, Metronomy, Micachu & The Shapes, Ariel Pink, Teenage Jesus and the Jerks & Vampire Weekend.
Episode 87: The Futureheads talk to Fahrusha, Hercules & Love Affair perform live, Adam Green, Thurston Moore & Byron Colley. Music videos from: Department of Eagles, The Presets, Vetiver, Starfucker, Bishop Allen, Andrew Thompson, Dent May
Episode 86: MC Steinberg interviews Woods, the Kids Korner, Fahrusha the Psychic, The Real Housewives of New York Noise, and Thurston Moore. Music videos from: Pete & The Pirates, Stephen Malkmus, Peter Bjorn & John, Sebastien Tellier, Metronomy, MGMT, Beach House, Beirut, Woods, Pere Ubu, and My Bloody Valentine.
Episode 85: MC Steinberg interviews Takka Takka, the Real Housewives of New York Noise, Thurston Moore & Byron Coley, Fahrusha the Psychic, The Soft Pack and Adam Green. Music videos from: Stereolab, Bricolage, Devo, Nancy Sinatra, Vivian Girls, Telepathe, Nite Jewel, Violent Femmes, Band of Horses, Soft Pack, Fleet Foxes, Band of Horses, Wild Beasts, Violent Femmes & Prefab Sprout.
Episode 84: "Cribs" with Chairlift, Woods performs, Adam Green, Friendly Fires, and Lykke Li. Music videos from: Here We Go Magic, Violens, Foals, The Go-Betweens, Ra Ra Riot, Chairlift, and CSS.
Episode 83: MC Steinberg interviews The Pains of Being Pure At Heart, a Pavement "pop-up" video, the Real Housewives of New York Noise, Farusha the Psychic and Thurston Moore.  Music videos from: Bush Tetras, Animal Collective, The Tough Alliance, Miami Horror, M83, Vampire Weekend, Abe Vigoda, Surf City, Matt & Kim, Crystal Stilts, and AU.
Episode 82: Adam Green interviews The Vaselines, Vivian Girls perform, plus Thurston Moore. Music videos from: Cause Co-motion, The Pains of Being Pure at Heart, Ladyhawke, Passion Pit, Empire of the Sun, Still Flyin', Of Montreal, Blondie, Animal Collective, No Age, and Little Joy.

2008

Episode 81: Interviews with Interpol, Ladybug Transistor, a recap of SXSW 2008 (featuring High Places, She & Him, The Ruby Suns, Fleet Foxes, and Cut Copy) and videos from Goldfrapp, Lykke Li, Múm, Noah & the Whale, Santogold, Tegan & Sara, Hot Chip, Hercules & Love Affair, The Presets, Meneguar, Health, The Death Set, and Ungdomskulen
Episode 80: A Les Savy Fav apartment tour, a fashion update with Yeasayer, an interview with Simian Mobile Disco, and videos from The Go! Team, Kid Sister, Metronomy, Justice, Tilly & the Wall, The Spinto Band, M83, Tunng, Thao and the Get Down Stay Down, Animal Collective, and Prinzhorn Dance School
Episode 79: Interviews with Sons and Daughters, Vampire Weekend, Les Savy Fav and "Patty Pitchfork", and videos from The Ruby Suns, The Shins, This Is Ivy League, Cut Off Your Hands, Someone Still Loves You Boris Yeltsin, The Black Lips, King Khan, The Teenagers, LCD Soundsystem, Band of Horses, and The Mae Shi
Episode 78: Record shopping with Mark Ronson and Peter Moren, interviews with Pinback and Klaxons, Le Loup live on KEXP, and videos from Andrew Thompson, The Sea and Cake, Basia Bulat, Headlights, Au Revoir Simone, The Clientele, MGMT, Klaxons, and Love of Diagrams
Episode 77: An interview and KEXP live performance from The Hold Steady, and interviews with Les Savy Fav, New York Noise VJ Search, and videos from Adam Green, The Go! Team, The Mountain Goats, Parts & Labor, Evangelicals, The Long Blondes, and Pete & The Pirates
Episode 76: Tim Harrington of Les Savy Fav celebrates Hanukkah, The Harlem Shakes perform on KEXP, interviews with Jens Lekman, Klaxons, and Vampire Weekend, and videos from Dr. Dog, Panda Bear, The Helio Sequence, Les Savy Fav, Imani, Of Montreal, and Cut Copy
Episode 75: Yeasayer interview and performance on KEXP, behind the scenes of a Ladybug Transistor video, interviews with Mark Ronson and The Black Kids, the New York Noise VJ Search, and videos from The Dodos, Au Revoir Simone, Shout Out Louds, Super Furry Animals, MGMT, Jeremy Jay, CSS, Holy Hail, and Jamie T
Episode 74: Vampire Weekend tours Morningside Heights, Au Revoir Simone begins the weekly New York Noise VJ Search 2008, a CMJ fashion report, an interview with Liars, an exclusive performance by Simian Mobile Disco recorded live at the KEXP CMJ broadcast, and music videos from The Thermals, My Teenage Stride, Hot Chip, Ra Ra Riot, Digitalism, New Young Pony Club, Love of Diagrams, O'Death, Vampire Weekend, Liars

2007

Episode 73: Apples in Stereo in Central Park
Episode 72: The National tours the United Nations building
Episode 71: Jeffrey Lewis hosts with his parents
Episode 70: Devlin & Darko of Spank Rock at the Big Apple Circus
Episode 69: Battles learn non-violent communication with Dr. Dian Killian
Episode 68: New York Noise's executive board takes over the show, with appearances from Andrew Thompson and Oxford Collapse
Episode 67: Peggy & Roy go head to head in the New York Noise Blogger War at SXSW, featuring interviews with Peter Bjorn & John, Voxtrot, The Pipettes, Menomena, Dan Deacon, Matt & Kim, Fujiya & Miyagi, and more.
Episode 66: Senior citizens judge music videos by The Hold Steady and Albert Hammond Jr., Of Montreal, Nicole Atkins, Dr. Dog, and The Knife
Episode 65: Antique Rockshow at the WFMU Record Fair, with music videos from Human Television, Saturday Looks Good To Me, The Magnetic Fields, Stephen Malkmus, Danielson, Animal Collective, Barbara Morgenstern, The Embassy, The Tough Alliance, Dr. Octagon, Yeah Yeah Yeahs and Talking Heads
Episode 64: "Disability Mentoring Day" behind the scenes of DFA Records, Insound.com, and Time Out NY, plus videos from The Rapture, LCD Soundsystem, Goldfrapp, Moby, CSS, TV on the Radio, Band of Horses, Tahiti 80 and The Knife
Episode 63: MC Steinberg interviews The Shins, The Rapture, Girl Talk, The Presets, Hot Chip, Forward, Russia!, The Knife, and Tokyo Police Club at the 2006 CMJ Music Festival.

2006

Episode 62: "My SuperSweet Barmitzvah" with Michael Leviton, plus videos from The Spinto Band, Tom Vek, The Strokes, Locksley, The Thermals, Art Brut, Klaxons, Klaus Nomi, José González, Menomena, Oliver Laric, Ralph Myerz & Jack Herren Band and Hot Chip
Episode 61: An inside look at the 2006 Pitchfork Music Festival with Aesop Rock, The Mountain Goats, The Futureheads, CSS, Yo La Tengo, Fred Armisen and roving fruit correspondent Ted Leo, with videos from The Heavy Blinkers, Pavement, Beirut, and M. Ward
Episode 60: A comparative study between the Willie Mae Rock Camp for Girls and Ethel's Music Camp, plus videos from Plastic Operator, Dr. Octagon, Asobi Seksu, Dick & Dee Dee, Michael Leviton, El Perro Del Mar, Klaxons, Dan Deacon, Danielson, Sonic Youth, Dungen, Art Brut, Arctic Monkeys and The Cribs
Episode 59: Live performances by Saturday Looks Good to Me, Mobius Band, Human Television, Meneguar and Fallen Angel Crying at the East River Music Project, along with videos from Field Music, Mates of State, Oliver Laric, Camera obscura, Broken Social Scene, Yeah Yeah Yeahs, Supersystem, Services, and Psapp
Episode 58: "Making the Video" with Beirut at the Sweet N’ Low sugar factory, with videos from Jamie Lidell, Feist, Regina Spektor, José González, TV on the Radio, Kudu, Spank Rock, Figurines, The Spinto Band, I'm From Barcelona, Suburban Kids with Biblical Names and The Besties
Episode 57: "Ms. New York" Staci Shands interviews Art Brut, The Cribs, Stars, Rogers Sisters, Tapes 'N Tapes, Dirty on Purpose, Man Man, Serena Maneesh at the 2006 Siren Festival, with videos from Dirty on Purpose, Tapes N Tapes, Islands, Rogers Sisters and Hot Chip
Episode 56: The Fiery Furnaces join up with the FDNY at Ladder 54 Engine 8 for a fire safety lesson, with videos from Irving, The Futureheads, Kelley Stoltz, Islands, Sonic Youth, The Rogers Sisters, The Presets, The Real Tuesday Weld, and They Might Be Giants
Episode 55: The Walkmen are interviewed, with videos from Fischerspooner, DJ Spooky, Jason Forrest, We Are Scientists, Spoon, Neko Case, Band of Horses, Dirty on Purpose, and Serena Maneesh
Episode 54: Kids critique music videos by The Cloud Room, Ezra Reich, LCD Soundsystem, The Knife, Blondie, Phofo, Animal Collective, and Arctic Monkeys
Episode 53: Simon Reynolds, author of "Rip It Up and Start Again: A History of Post-Punk" is interviewed while people get "post-punk haircuts", with videos from Talking Heads, Orange Juice, OMD, Klaus Nomi, A Certain Ratio, ESG, Josef K, Franz Ferdinand, Monochrome Set, Devo and The Raincoats
Episode 52: SXSW 2006 with Ted Leo, Art Brut, Aziz Ansari & Paul Scheer, Ryan Schreiber from Pitchfork Media, Serena Maneesh, Calla, Clap Your Hands Say Yeah, and Au Revoir Simone, with performances by The New Pornographers, Joggers, Love Is All, Clap Your Hands Say Yeah, Matt & Kim, Meneguar, Psychic Ills, The Boy Least Likely To, Belle & Sebastian, and Afrirampo, with  videos from Baby Dayliner, The Go! Team, Pizzicato Five, Shugo Tokumaru, Arctic Monkeys, Menomena, and Ivy League
Episode 51: Adam Green hosts "The Adam Green Variety Hour" with guests Jenny Lewis, Rogue Wave, Jeffrey Lewis, Kimya Dawson, Animal Collective, The Strokes, Langhorne Slim, Mr. Scruff, Human Television, and The Knife
Episode 50: Walter Kuhr of The Main Squeeze Orchestra is interviewed, with videos from Envelopes, Of Montreal, Gogol Bordello, The Cloud Room, The Walkmen, Test Icicles, Liars, Burnside Project, Annie, Phofo, Ezra Reich, and The Peachwaves
Episode 49: Aziz Ansari hosts the 2006 PLUG Awards, with appearances by TV on the Radio, The National, Beans, Holy Fuck, Celebration, Emiliana Torrini, Chad VanGaalen Claire and Patrick from OhMyRockness.com, Jack Rabid of Big Takeover, and Nick Sylvester.

2005

Episode 48 Highlights from previous episodes and the best videos of 2005, including The National, Jason Forrest, M.I.A., The Go! Team, and Out Hud
Episode 47: The Hold Steady perform at The Variety Club Boys & Girls Club of Queens, plus videos from Ivy, The Clientele, The Magic Numbers, Pia Fraus, Snoozer, Sons & Daughters, Cornelius, No-Neck Blues Band, Talking Heads, The Double, Bright Eyes, The Bats, and Run On
Episode 46: J from The Cloud Room and Nicole Atkins go on a blind date, plus videos from Wolf Parade, Grizzly Bear, Bright Lights, Beat Happening, The Knife, and Matt Pond PA
Episode 45: Aziz Ansari & Rob Huebel portray Pitchfork Media's Thadius P. Scornburner and Nigel P. Radcliffe at the Upright Citizens Brigade Theatre, plus videos from Pinback, My Morning Jacket, Devendra Banhart, Pavement, Chalets, Bloc Party, Burnside Project, LCD Soundsystem, and The Go! Team
Episode 44: "WFMU Record Fair" with radio personalities Brian Turner, Small Change, DJ Trouble, OCDJ, Small Change, and Mac of Antique Phonograph, plus Brian Turner shares videos from Afrirampo, Lightning Bolt, The Fall, Serge Gainsbourg, Captain Beefheart, Devo, and Deerhoof
Episode 43: Oneida gives a tour of their studio, plus videos from Jason Forrest, Antony & The Johnsons, Shout Out Louds, Mother and the Addicts, The Peachwaves & Goblin Cock
Episode 42: Bishop Allen host a rooftop barbecue along with Funny Ha Ha director Andrew Bujalski, plus videos from Mates of State, CocoRosie, Sleater-Kinney, Spoon, Bloc Party, Out Hud, Smog, and The Fiery Furnaces
Episode 41: Hosts Eugene Mirman & Langhorne Slim hand out fried scallops, highlights from the New York Noise CMJ Showcase with Au Revoir Simone and Mahogany, along with other CMJ clips featuring The Besties, Of Montreal, The Hold Steady, Why?, Tomorrow's Friend, The Castanets, Skeletons & the Girl-Faced Boys, The Gossip, Blood on the Wall, and Test-Icicles
Episode 40: An inside look at the first Willie Mae Rock Camp For Girls, plus videos from Dirty on Purpose, Stars, Sons & Daughters, The Legends, and OK Go
Episode 39: Hosts Carl Newman of the New Pornographers, and Dave Martin at the Beggars Group 10th Anniversary, with cameos by Fred Armisen, and Dean Wareham, plus videos from the Beggars Group catalogue, including The New Pornographers, The Double, Calla, The Avalanches, M/A/R/R/S, Cocteau Twins, Charlatans, and The Pixies
Episode 38: Man Parrish & Richard Barone talk about Klaus Nomi, with footage from the documentary, The Nomi Song, as well as videos by Architecture in Helsinki, Of Montreal, The Cloud Room, and LCD Soundsystem
Episode 37: Trachtenburg Family Slideshow Players host from their East Village apartment, with music videos from M83, Spoon, The Arcade Fire, Mr. Scruff, and Interpol
Episode 36: My Favorite gives summer reading recommendations from the New York Public Library, with performances from SXSW (by Voxtrot, LCD Soundsystem, M.I.A., Dirty on Purpose, Hot Chip, Kings of Convenience, and Ariel Pink), and videos from Emiliana Torrini, Jennifer Gentle, Iron & Wine
Episode 35: Kids judge videos by Sparks, The Real Tuesday Weld, Suburban Kids With Biblical Names, and Adam Green
Episode 34: Ben Goldberg of The Leaf Label listens to top 40 music for 30 days straight to investigate the harmful effects, plus videos from M.I.A., Solvent, Antony & the Johnsons, and Caribou
Episode 33: Fischerspooner is interviewed, plus videos from ESG, Sonic Youth, Beck, Matisyahu, Enon, and Talking Heads
Episode 32: The National is interviewed, plus videos from Bright Eyes, Sleater-Kinney, Annie, and The Shout Out Louds
Episode 31: Tommy Ramone sips tea and talks about the Ramones documentary, End of the Century, with videos from Fischerspooner, My Favorite, and Brazilian Girls
Episode 30: Animal Collective is interviewed at a cupcake shop, with videos from Ariel Pink, Suburban Kids with Biblical Names, Devendra Banhart, Matisyahu
Episode 29: International whistling champion Steve "the Whistler" Herbst gives whistled renditions of songs by Adam Green, M.I.A., My Favorite, The Postal Service, and Jens Lekman, with videos from The National, Dirty Projectors, and Aberfeldy
Episode 28: The members of 33 Hz cook a turducken and perform at the NYCTV Winter Launch, with videos from Regina Spektor, Annie, Emiliana Torrini, Sonic Youth, and Supersystem
Episode 27: WFMU DJ and musician Jason Forrest is interviewed, with videos from Beck, LCD Soundsystem, Röyksopp, and Kings of Convenience
Episode 26: Interview with Chris from CMJ, about the CMJ Music Marathon
Episode 25: Le Tigre is interviewed
Episode 24: ?
Episode 23: Featuring Tommy Ramone Ramones- Rock & Roll High School Bloc Party- Banquet Human Television- Mars Red Dust Adem- These Are Your Friends The Walkmen- We’ve Been Had Ramones- I Wanna Be Sedated Joanna Newsom- Sprout & the Bean Devendra Banhart- A Ribbon The Real Tuesday Weld- Bathtime in Clerkenwell Fischerspooner- Just Let Go Brazilian Girls- Don't Stop Ramones- Do You Remember Rock & Roll Radio Darude- Cowboy S-Stomp LCD Soundsystem- Daft Punk is Playing at My House
Episode 22:  Featuring the Animal Collective The Dears- Lost in the Plot Jeffrey Lewis- Don't Let the Record label Take You Out To Lunch The Organ- Brother The Bravery- Honest Mistake MIA- Galang Danielson Famile- Rubbernecker Suburban Kids with Biblical Names- Rent a W reck Mice Parade- Focus on the Rollercoaster Mum- Green Grass of Tunnel Animal Collective- Who Could Win a Rabbit Ariel Pink- For Kate I Wait
Episode 21: ?
Episode 20: ?
Episode 19: ?
Episode 18: CMJ 2004 Music Marathon featuring Midlake, The Russian Futurists, Poingly, Danielson feat. Sufjan Stevens, The Organ, Parker and Lily, and Smoosh
Episode 17: Ted Leo & the Pharmacists- Me & Mia Concretes- You Can't Hurry Love Interpol- Slow Hands Bloc Party- Banquet Human Television- Tell Me What You Want Bonnie Prince Billy- Horses Boyskout- Jesse James Animal Collective- Who Could Win a Rabbit Jeffrey Lewis- Don't Let the Record Label Take You Out To Lunch Devendra Banhart- At the Hop Sparks- The Rhythm Thief Moving Units- Available Futureheads- First Day My Favorite- Happiest Days of My Life Le Tigre- TKO

2003–2004

Episode 16: Videos from Interpol, Prosaics, The Mazing Vids, The Moldy Peaches, My Favorite and Boyskout
Episode 15: Live footage of Jeffrey Lewis and White Magic, along with videos from Radio 4, Burnside Project, The Wrens, Eltro, Cat Power, Mixel Pixel & ROTFLOL
Episode 14: Videos from The Stills, Adam Green, The Boggs, Chromeo, !!!, Joanna Newsom, Bonnie Prince Billy, and My Favorite
Episode 13: Live footage of Ari-Up of The Slits performing an ode to New York City with her son, along with videos from Burnside Project, !!!, My Favorite &  Prosaics
Episode 12: Videos from The Boggs, Chromeo, Radio 4, The Rapture, The Real Tuesday Weld, The Natural History, DJ Spooky, My Favorite, The Walkmen, The Stills & Calla
Episode 11: Live footage of White Magic, Prosaics and ESG, along with videos from My Favorite, Burnside Project, The Thermals, The High Strung, Iron & Wine, and The French Kicks
Episode 10: The Sleepy Jackson- "Good Dancers" Dir. Nash Edgerton (Astralwerks)Radio 4- "White Man in Hammersmith Palais" Dir. Punkcast.com from Joe Strummer tribute (Astralwerks) The Natural History- "Watch This House" Dir. Ryan Junell (Startime) The Oranges Band- "Finns For Our Feet" Dir. Farah (Lookout!) ESG- "You’re No Good" Dir. Punkcast.com (99) Pepe Deluxe- "Girl" Dir. Paul Malmstrom & Linus karlsson (Emperor Norton) Ralph Myerz & The Jack Herren Band- "Think Twice" Dir. G.H. Hopland & Arild Fröhlich (Emperor Norton) Burnside Project- "Cue the Pulse To Begin" Dir. Jacob Hensberry (Bar None) Franz Ferdinand- "Take Me Out" Dir.Jonas Odell (Domino) French Kicks- "When You Heard You" Dir. Brett Simon (StarTime) Seconds- "Baby" Dir. Punkcast.com (5RC) Oneida- "Privilege" Dir. Punkcast.com (Jagjaguwar) Sonic Youth- "100%" Dir. Tamra Davis (DGC) The Prosaics- "Now the Shadow of the Column" Dir. Punkcast.com (Unsigned) Cat Power- "He War" Dir. Brett Vapnek (Matador) Run On- "Christmas Trip" Dir. Mark Steiner (Matador)
Episode 9: The Moldy Peaches- "Lucky Charms" Dir. Punkcast.com (Rough Trade) Spoon- "The Way We Get By" Dir. Steve Hanft (Merge) The Boggs- "Plant Me a Rose" Dir. Julia Li (Arena Rock) Franz Ferdinand- "Take Me Out" Dir.Jonas Odell (Domino) Mando Diao- "Sheepdog" Dir. Pontus Anderson (Muze) The Strokes- "12:51″ Dir. Roman Coppola (RCA) Yeah Yeah Yeahs- "Rich" Dir. Punkcast.com (Interscope) Junior Senior- "Shake Your Coconuts" Dir. Diane Martel (Crunchy Frog/ Atlantic) The Real Tuesday Weld- "Terminally Ambivalent Over You" Dir. Alex Budovsky (Dreamy) The Pixies- "Debaser" Dir. Vaughan Oliver/ v23 (4AD) The Natural History- "Watch This House" Dir. Ryan Junell (Startime) The Oranges Band- "Finns For Our Feet" Dir. Farah (Lookout!) Pretty Girls Make Graves- "This is Our Emergency" Dir. Mike Ott & Jason Harris (Matador) Interpol- "PDA" Dir. Christopher Mills (Matador) The Rapture- "House of Jealous Lovers" Dir. Shynola (Mercury) Cat Power- "Cross Bones Style" Dir. Brett Vapnek (Matador)
Episode 8: The Thrills- "One Horse Town" Dir. Max Dodson (Virgin) Ivy- "I Hate December" (Scratchie) The Sleepy Jackson- "Good Dancers" Dir. Nash Edgerton (Astralwerks) Adam Green- "Jessica" Dir. Mission (Rough Trade) Yeah Yeah Yeahs- "Maps" Dir. Patrick Daughters (Interscope) Franz Ferdinand- "Take Me Out" Dir.Jonas Odell (Domino) Ladytron- "Seventeen" Dir. David Chaudoir (Emperor Norton) Felix Da Housecat- "What Does It Feel Like" Dir. Elliot Chaffer (Emperor Norton) Ursula 1000- "Kinda Kinky" Dir. Sherry Parnes (ESL) MC Honky- "Sonnet #3″ Dir. D. E. Macken (SpinArt) The Prosaics- "Now the Shadow of the Column" Dir. Punkcast.com (Unsigned) Spoon- "Everything Hits at Once" Dir. Divya Srinivasan & Peter Simonite (Merge) Calla- "Televised" Dir. Moh Azima (Arena Rock) Kevin Shields- "City Girl" Dir. Sofia Coppola (Emperor Norton)
Episode 7: Britta Phillips & Dean Wareham- "Night Nurse" Dir. Stefano Giovannini (Jetset) Cat Power- "He War" Dir. Brett Vapnek (Matador) Schwervon!- "Song for Weddings and Funerals" Dir. Punkcast.com (N/A) Schneider TM & Kpt Michigan- "The Light 3000″ Dir. Elger Emig, Ritchie Riediger (Mute/ City Slang) The Boggs- "How Long?" Dir. Jason Friedman (Arena Rock) Calla- "Televised" Dir. Moh Azima (Arena Rock) French Kicks- "When You Heard You" Dir. Brett Simon (StarTime) The Natural History- "Watch This House" Dir. Ran Junell (Startime) ESG- "You’re No Good" Dir. Punkcast.com (99) Yeah Yeah Yeahs- "Maps" Dir. Patrick Daughters (Interscope) The Sleepy Jackson- "Good Dancers" Dir. Nash Edgerton (Astralwerks) The Strokes- "12:51″ Dir. Roman Coppola (RCA) Death Cab for Cutie- "The New Year" Dir. Jay Martin (Barsuk) Interpol- "Obstacle 1″ Dir. Floria Sigismondi (Matador) Stellastarr*- "In the Walls" Dir. Peter McCoubrey (RCA) 
Episode 6: Yo La Tengo- "From a Motel 6″ Dir. Hal Hartley (Matador) Britta Phillips & Dean Wareham- "Night Nurse" Dir. Stefano Giovannini (JetSet) Calla- "Televised" Dir. Moh Azima (Arena Rock) Cat Power- "Cross Bones Style" Dir. Brett Vapnek (Matador) Stellastarr*- "In the Walls" Dir. Peter McCoubrey (RCA) Adam Green- "Jessica" Dir. Mission (Rough Trade) Burnside Project- "Cue the Pulse To Begin" Dir. Jacob Hensberry (Bar-None) Ursula 1000- "Kinda Kinky" Dir. Sherry Parnes (ESL) MC Honky- "Sonnet #3″ Dir. D. E. Macken (SpinArt) The Real Tuesday Weld- "Bathtime in Clerkenwell" Dir. Alex Budovsky (Dreamy) Super Furry Animals- "Hello Sunshine" Dir. Pete Fowler (Sony/XL/Beggars Group) Spoon- "The Way We Get By" Dir. Steve Hanft (Merge) Liars- "Mr. You’re on Fire Mr." (Blast First/Mute) Pretty Girls Make Graves- "This Is Our Emergency" Dir. Mike Ott & Jason Harris (Matador) Rapture- "House of Jealous Lovers" Dir. Shynola (Mercury)
Episode 5: White Magic- "One Note" Dir. Punkcast.com Luna- "Lovedust" Dir. Dave Steck (Jetset) Flaming Lips- "Yoshimi Battles the Lonely Robot" Dir. Wayne Coyne (Warner Bros.) The Pixies- "Dig For Fire" Dir. Peter Scammell (4AD) Yeah Yeah Yeahs- "Yeah! New York" Dir. Punkcast.com (Interscope) Jon Spencer Blues Explosion- "Flavor" Dir. Evan Bernard (Matador) Interpol- "NYC" Dir. Doug Aitken (Matador) TV on the Radio- "Young Liars" Dir. Punkcast.com (Touch and Go) hneider TM & Kpt Michigan- "The Light 3000″ Dir. Elger Emig & Ritchie Riediger (Mute/ City Slang) Spoon- "Everything Hits at Once" Dir. Divya Srinivasan & Peter Simonite (Merge) Sonic Youth- "Titanium Expose" Dir. Phil Morrison (DGC) Ex Models- "Sex Automata" Dir. Syd Butler & Oriana Soddu (Frenchkiss) The Rapture- "House of Jealous Lovers" Dir. Shynola (Mercury)
Episode 4: Spoon- "The Way We Get By" Dir. Steve Hanft (Merge) Elefant- "Now That I Miss Her" Dir. Christopher Mills (Kemado/ Palm) Longwave- "Wake Me When It’s Over" Dir. Moh Azima (RCA) The Real Tuesday Weld- "Bathtime in Clerkenwell" Dir. Alex Budovsky (Dreamy) MC Honky- "Sonnet #3″ Dir. D. E. Macken (SpinArt) Ursula 1000- "Kinda Kinky" Dir. Sherry Parnes (ESL) The Walkmen- "We’ve Been Had" Dir. Ting Poo & Aj Pyatak (Startime) Calla – "Televised" Dir. Moh Azima (Arena Rock) Mando Diao- "Sheepdog" Dir. Pontus Anderson (Mute) Sahara Hotnights- "Alright Alright" Dir. Jeff Tremaine (Jetset) Chavez- "Unreal is Here" Dir. Scott Marshall & Clay Traver (Matador) Cat Power- "Nude as the News" Dir. Brett Vapnek (Matador) Ivy- I Hate December (Scratchie) Ari-Up- "New York" Dir. Punkcast.com Adam Green- "Bungee" Dir. Punkcast.com (Rough Trade)
Episode 3: DJ Spooky- "Ibid, Désmarches, Ibid" Dir. Madeleine Leskin (Thirsty Ear) Schneider TM & Kpt Michigan- "The Light 3000″ Dir. Elger Emig, Ritchie Riedier (Mute/ City Slang) Burnside Project- "Cue the Pulse To Begin" Dir. Jacob Hensberry (Bar None) Ivy-"Let’s Go To Bed" Dir. Stefano Giovannini (Minty Fresh) Britta Phillips & Dean Wareham- "Night Nurse" Dir. Stefano Giovannini (JetSet) Yo La Tengo- "Sugarcube" Dir. Phil Morrison (Matador) Pixies- "Here Comes Your Man" Dir. Bekemeier/ Pollock (4AD) Radio 4- "Dance to the Underground" Dir. Matt Bass (Astralwerks/ City Slang) Interpol- "PDA" Dir. Christopher Mills (Matador) Ted Leo & The Pharmacists- "Where Have All the Rude Boys Gone?" Dir. Max Landes (Lookout!) Rapture- "House of Jealous Lovers" Dir. Shynola (Mercury)The Kills- "Fried My Little Brains" Dir. Grant Gee (Rough Trade) Ex Models- "Sex Automata" Dir. Syd Butler/ Oriana Soddu (Frenchkiss)
Episode 2: Luna- "Lovedust" Dir. Dave Steck (Jetset) Ladybug Transistor- "Brighton Bound" Dir. Punkcast.com (Merge) The New Pornographers- "The Laws Have Changed" Dir. Blaine Thurier (Matador) Ursula 1000- "Kinda Kinky" Dir. Sherry Parnes (ESL) Junior Senior- "Move Your Feet" Dir. Shynola (Atlantic) Client- "Rock & Roll Machine" Dir. Toma & Luc (Mute) The Rapture- "House of Jealous Lovers" Dir. Shynola (Strummer/DFA/Universal) Touchdown- "Phasey" Dir. Leesaw Andaloro & Punkcast.com Interpol- "NYC" Dir. Doug Aitken (Matador) Longwave- "Wake Me Up When It’s Over" Dir. Moh Azima (RCA) The Strokes- "Someday"	Dir. Roman Coppola (RCA) The Real Tuesday Weld- "Bathtime in Clerkenwell" Dir. Alex Budovsky (Dreamy) Sparks- "The Rhythm Thief" Dir. Kuntzel & Deygas (Palm) Jon Spencer Blues Explosion- "Talk About the Blues" Dir. Evan Bernard (Matador)
Episode 1: Radio 4- "Dance To the Underground" Dir. Matt Bass (City Slang) The Liars- "Mr. You’re on Fire Mr." (Blast First/Mute) Flaming Lips- "Yoshimi Battles the Lonely Robot" Dir. Wayne Coyne (Warner Bros.) Cat Power- "He War" Dir. Brett Vapnek (Matador) Sonic Youth- "Bull in the Heather" Dir. Tamra Davis/ Kim Gordon	(DGC) Ted Leo & the Pharmacists- "Where Have All the Rude Boys Gone?"	Dir. Max Landes	(Lookout!) Walkmen – "We’ve Been Had" Dir. Ting Poo & Aj Pyatak (Startime International) Interpol- "PDA"	Dir. Christopher Mills	(Matador) Elefant- "Now That I Miss Her" Dir. Christopher Mills	(Kemado) Ursula 1000- "Kinda Kinky" Dir. Sherry Parnes (ESL) Client- "Rock & Roll Machine" Dir. Toma & Luc (Mute) Burnside Project- "Cue the Pulse To  Begin" Dir. Jacob Hensberry	(Bar None) Northern State- "At the Party" Dir. Kurt St. Thomas (Columbia) DJ Spooky- "Ibid, Désmarches, Ibid" Dir. Madeleine Leskin (Thirsty Ear)

References

External links
  NYNOISE.TV - New York Noise TV
 Village Voice- Best of 2006
 Gothamist Interviews Shirley Braha
 
 Petition to Bring New York Noise back to NYCTV

American public access television shows
Local music television shows in the United States